Microdactylites, which is sometimes considered to be a synonym of Dactylioceras, is genus of ammonite that lived during early to middle Toarcian stage (Serpentinum to lower Bifrons ammonite Zones) of early Jurassic. Their fossils were found in England, France, Italy, Germany and Hungary. Species belonging to this genus were microconchs of Dactylioceras.

Description
Ammonites belonging to Microdactylites have small shells with evolute, compressed coiling. Flanks are slightly convex to convex and whorl section is suboval to subcircular. Ribbing is dense, while ribs can be both simple or bifurcating.

References

Ammonitida
Toarcian life
Early Jurassic ammonites of Europe
Ammonite genera